Norbert Haupert (born 2 April 1940, in Schifflange) is a retired Luxembourgish athlete and currently a politician, sitting in the Chamber of Deputies for the Christian Social People's Party.  Like Josy Barthel before him, Haupert spanned the divide between sport and politics by heading the Luxembourg Athletics Federation and the Luxembourgian Olympic and Sporting Committee.

As an athlete, he ran middle distance, dominating Luxembourgian middle distance running in the early 1960s and twice doubling up to win both the 800 metres and 1500 metres at the Luxembourgian national championships.  He also won the bronze medal at the 800 metres at the 1963 World Student Games. He represented Luxembourg at the 1960 Summer Olympics.

In addition to sitting in the Chamber, Haupert has been a member of the Mondercange communal council since 1 January 1999.

Footnotes

External links
 Chamber of Deputies profile

|-

Members of the Chamber of Deputies (Luxembourg)
Members of the Chamber of Deputies (Luxembourg) from Sud
Councillors in Mondercange
Christian Social People's Party politicians
Luxembourgian male middle-distance runners
Luxembourgian sportsperson-politicians
Athletes (track and field) at the 1960 Summer Olympics
Luxembourgian male sprinters
Olympic athletes of Luxembourg
Universiade medalists in athletics (track and field)
1940 births
Living people
People from Schifflange
Universiade medalists for Luxembourg
Medalists at the 1963 Summer Universiade